Petroleuciscus is a genus of four species of ray-finned fish in the family Cyprinidae. It was usually included in Leuciscus until recently. This genus unites the Ponto-Caspian chubs and daces. Recent research has indicated that Petroleuciscus esfahani is probably a synonym of Alburnus doriae.

Species 
 Petroleuciscus borysthenicus (Kessler, 1859) (Dnieper chub)
 Petroleuciscus esfahani Coad & Bogutskaya, 2010
 Petroleuciscus kurui (Bogutskaya, 1995) (Tigris chub)
 Petroleuciscus smyrnaeus (Boulenger, 1896)

References 

 

 
Taxa named by Nina Gidalevna Bogutskaya
Taxonomy articles created by Polbot